Brendon Gotuno is a Papua New Guinean professional rugby league footballer who plays as a  for the Papua New Guinea Hunters in the Queensland Cup.

He was signed by the Penrith Panthers  through the Lion Heart International (LHI) Sports Foundation program to play for  their Intrust Super Premiership team in 2019 but due to visa and passport complications he returned to the Papua New Guinea Hunters for the 2019 season.

References

1995 births
Living people
Papua New Guinea Hunters players
Papua New Guinean rugby league players
Rugby league centres